“Slangman” David Burke is the author/creator of over 100 products and books on how to use and understand slang and idioms in different languages.

References

Living people
American male non-fiction writers
Linguists from the United States
Year of birth missing (living people)